The Mangakino Stream is a tributary of the Waikato River. It flows into Lake Maraetai just upstream of the Mangakino township.

The Mangakino Stream is approximately 40 km in length.

The stream was once known as Mangakino River. By 1949 both names were in use.

Etymology

In Māori, mangakino means "stagnant (or useless) stream" (manga = stream, kino = useless or stagnant).

References

External links 
Water Quality – Mangakino River at Sandel Rd – Waikato Regional Council
Water Quality – Mangakino Stm (Whakamaru) at Sandel Rd- LAWA
River Flow – Mangakino at Dillon Road – NIWA managed recording site
Waikato River Trails

Tributaries of the Waikato River
Rivers of Waikato
Rivers of New Zealand